Jesika Malečková was the defending champion but lost to Francesca Jones in the first round.

Sára Bejlek won the title, defeating Paula Ormaechea in the final, 6–0, 6–0.

Seeds

Draw

Finals

Top half

Bottom half

References

Main Draw

ITS Cup - Singles